George Li (born August 24, 1995) is an American concert pianist who was a recipient of an Avery Fisher Career Grant in 2016 and silver medalist of the 2015 International Tchaikovsky Competition.

Early life
George Li was born on August 24, 1995, in Boston, Massachusetts, to parents from the People's Republic of China. He began piano lessons at the age of 4, and later studied with Yin Chengzong, before transferring to teachers Wha Kyung Byun and Russell Sherman.

Career 

Li made his orchestral debut with the Xiamen Philharmonic at the age of 9, a year after which he made his solo recital debut in his native Boston. Since then, he has been a recitalist, chamber musician, and concerto soloist. At the age of 11, he made his Carnegie Hall debut, which was featured in the new TV series produced by NPR, From the Top. His performance on the Martha Stewart Show followed two weeks later.

Among the orchestras he has soloed with include the Los Angeles Philharmonic, Mariinsky Orchestra, Orchestre National de Lyon, Deutsches Symphonie-Orchester Berlin, St. Petersburg Philharmonic, Rotterdam Philharmonic, Cleveland Orchestra, Xiamen Philharmonic Orchestra, Royal Liverpool Philharmonic Orchestra, Simon Bolivar Symphony Orchestra, Boston Philharmonic Orchestra, Brooklyn Philharmonic, Waltham Symphony Orchestra, Princeton Symphony Orchestra, Albany Symphony Orchestra, Lexington Symphony Orchestra, and Detroit Symphony Orchestra.

Li was awarded first prize in the Massachusetts Music Teachers Association state competitions at the age of 6 and 7. In 2005, Li won second prize in both the Virginia Waring International Piano Competition  and the Cincinnati World Piano Competition at the age of nine. In 2008, Li won the second prize in the Gina Bachauer International Piano Junior Artist Competition. In 2010, Li captured first prize in the inaugural Cooper International Piano Competition  Just months after his triumph in Oberlin, George Li captured first prize in the 2010 Young Concert Artists International Auditions.

On June 7, 2011, Li performed for President Barack Obama and Michelle Obama, German Chancellor Dr. Angela Merkel and her husband Dr. Joachim Sauer at a state dinner in the White House Rose Garden. On June 23, 2011, Li was selected to be one of the two recipients of the 2012 Gilmore Young Artist Award. He is currently the youngest recipient of the award.

On July 1, 2015, Li won second prize, tied with Lukas Geniušas, in the XV International Tchaikovsky Competition. Since then, he has enjoyed a busy international performing career, including recitals, chamber music performances, and  appearances with major orchestras in North America, Asia, and Europe. He was one of the four recipients of the 2016 Avery Fisher Career Grant.

Life 
Li resides in Lexington, Massachusetts. He graduated from Walnut Hill School and the New England Conservatory Preparatory School, where he studied with Wha Kyung Byun and Russell Sherman.

Li graduated from the dual degree program at Harvard University and the New England Conservatory in 2018.  He is currently a candidate in New England Conservatory's prestigious and highly-selective Artist Diploma program.

References

External links 
 
George Li on YouTube
George Li on Facebook
George Li on InstantEncore
George Li's Musical Journey: 2005 to 2010 - watch on YouTube
George Li on Yahoo! Music

American child musicians
Living people
1995 births
21st-century classical pianists
Musicians from Boston
American people of Chinese descent
American classical pianists
Male classical pianists
American male pianists
Harvard University alumni
21st-century American pianists
New England Conservatory alumni
Child classical musicians
21st-century American male musicians